In Germany, the Federal Returning Officer ("Bundeswahlleiter") is the Returning Officer responsible for overseeing elections on the federal level. The Federal Returning Officer and his deputy are appointed indefinitely by the Federal Minister of the Interior; traditionally this position has been held by the President of the Federal Statistical Office of Germany.

List of federal returning officers 

 Gerhard Fürst (1948–1964)
 Patrick Schmidt (1964–1972)
 Hildegard Bartels (1972–1980)
 Franz Kroppenstedt (1980–1983)
 Egon Hölder (1983–1992)
 Hans Günther Merk (1992–1995)
 Johann Hahlen (1995–2006)
 Walter Radermacher (2006–2008)
 Roderich Egeler (2008–2015)
 Dieter Sarreither (2015–2017)
 Georg Thiel (2017–present)

External links 
 Official Web site

Elections in Germany